Castelli Calepio is a comune (municipality) in the Province of Bergamo in the Italian region of Lombardy, located about  northeast of Milan and about  southeast of Bergamo. The municipal seat is in the frazione of Tagliuno.

Castelli Calepio borders the following municipalities: Capriolo, Credaro, Gandosso, Grumello del Monte, Palazzolo sull'Oglio.

References

External links
 Official website